Béarnaise sauce is a sauce made of clarified butter emulsified in egg yolks and white wine vinegar and flavored with herbs.  It is widely regarded as the "child" of the Hollandaise sauce. The difference is only in the flavoring: Béarnaise uses shallot, chervil, peppercorns, and tarragon in a reduction of vinegar and wine, while Hollandaise is made of a reduction of lemon juice or white wine vinegar, with white peppercorns and a pinch of cayenne instead of the above seasonings.

The sauce's name is related to the province of Béarn, France. It is light yellow and opaque, smooth and creamy, and a traditional sauce for steak.

History
The sauce was accidentally invented by the chef Jean-Louis Françoise-Collinet, the accidental inventor of puffed potatoes (pommes de terre soufflées), and served at the 1836 opening of Le Pavillon Henri IV, a restaurant at Saint-Germain-en-Laye. This assumption is supported by the fact that the restaurant was in the former residence of Henry IV of France, a gourmet himself, who was from Béarn, a former province now in the department of Pyrénées-Atlantiques.

Preparation

As with Hollandaise sauce, there are several methods for preparing of Béarnaise sauce. The most common uses a bain-marie (whisking to a temperature of ), where a reduction of vinegar is used to acidulate the yolks. Escoffier calls for a reduction of wine, vinegar, shallots, fresh chervil, fresh tarragon and crushed peppercorns (later strained out), with fresh tarragon and chervil to finish instead of lemon juice.  Others are similar.

Alternatively, the flavorings may be added to a finished Hollandaise (without lemon juice). Joy of Cooking describes a blender preparation with the same ingredients.

Derivatives 
 Sauce Choron or sauce béarnaise tomatée is a variation of béarnaise without tarragon or chervil, but with added tomato purée.  It is named after Alexandre Étienne Choron.
 Sauce Foyot (also known as Valois) is béarnaise with meat glaze (glace de viande) added.
 Sauce Paloise is a version of béarnaise with mint substituted for tarragon.

See also

 List of sauces
 Steak sauce

References

Sources

External links

 Béarnaise sauce from the British Good Food TV channel

French sauces
Occitan cuisine
Steak sauces
Foods featuring butter
Egg-based sauces